Elizabeth Hardwick may refer to:
Bess of Hardwick (1527–1608), Elizabethan courtier
Elizabeth Hardwick (writer) (1916–2007), American literary critic, novelist, and short story writer